Linus Sandgren  (born 5 December 1972) is a Swedish cinematographer, known for his collaborations with directors Damien Chazelle, David O. Russell, Gus Van Sant, and the duo of Måns Mårlind and Björn Stein. He is known for his use of unique and unconventional formats, shooting Van Sant's Promised Land in 4-perf Super 35mm 1.3x anamorphic for a 1.85:1 aspect ratio.

For his work on La La Land (2016), which he shot in the classic Cinemascope ratio 2.55:1, he won the Academy Award, BAFTA, Critics Choice among other awards for his cinematography. He is additionally the recipient of a Guldbagge Award, Sweden's highest film honor. He is a member of both the American and Swedish Society of Cinematographers. He also shot No Time to Die, directed by Cary Joji Fukunaga, the 25th James Bond film.

Filmography

Short films

Feature film

Television

Critics Awards

Won
 2016: Critics' Choice Movie Award for Best Cinematography – La La Land
 2016: Washington D.C. Area Film Critics Association Award for Best Cinematography – La La Land
 2016: Atlanta Film Critics Society Award for Best Cinematography – La La Land
 2016: Chicago Film Critics Association Award for Best Cinematography – La La Land
 2016: Dallas–Fort Worth Film Critics Association Award for Best Cinematography – La La Land
 2016: Phoenix Film Critics Society Award for Best Cinematography – La La Land 
 2016: Las Vegas Film Critics Society Award for Best Cinematography – La La Land  
 2016: Southeastern Film Critics Association  Award for Best Cinematography – La La Land 
 2016: St. Louis Gateway Film Critics Association Award for Best Cinematography – La La Land 
 2016: Utah Film Critics Association Award for Best Cinematography – La La Land 
 2016: Nevada Film Critics Association Award for Best Cinematography – La La Land 
 2016: Florida Film Critics Circle Award for Best Cinematography – La La Land 
 2016: Austin Film Critics Association Awards for Best Cinematography – La La Land
 2016: North Texas Film Critics Association Awards for Best Cinematography – La La Land
 2016: North Carolina Film Critics Association Awards for Best Cinematography – La La Land
 2016: Houston Film Critics Society Award for Best Cinematography – La La Land
 2017: Online Film Critics Society Award for Best Cinematography  – La La Land
 2017: Central Ohio Film Critics Association Awards for Best Cinematography – La La Land
 2017: Hawaii Film Critics Society Award for Best Cinematography  – La La Land
 2018: Dublin Film Critics Circle Award for Best Cinematography – First Man
 2023: San Diego Film Critics Society Award for Best Cinematography - Babylon

2nd Place
 2016: Los Angeles Film Critics Association Award for Best Cinematography – La La Land
 2016: San Diego Film Critics Society Award for Best Cinematography – La La Land
 2016: Indiewire Critics Poll Award for Best Cinematography – La La Land
 2017: National Society of Film Critics Award for Best Cinematography – La La Land
 2018: North Texas Film Critics Association Awards for Best Cinematography – First Man

Nominated
 2016: San Francisco Film Critics Circle Awards for Best Cinematography – La La Land
 2016: Alliance of Women Film Journalists EDA Award for Best Cinematography – La La Land 
 2016: Satellite Award for Best Cinematography – La La Land 
 2017: Seattle Film Critics Association Awards for Best Cinematography – La La Land
 2018: Washington D.C. Area Film Critics Association Award for Best Cinematography – First Man
 2018: Chicago Film Critics Association Award for Best Cinematography – First Man
 2018: Los Angeles Online Film Critics Society Award for Best Cinematography – First Man
 2018: San Francisco Film Critics Circle Awards for Best Cinematography – First Man
 2018: S:t Louis Film Critics Circle Awards for Best Cinematography – First Man
 2018: Alliance of Women Film Journalists EDA Award for Best Cinematography – First Man
 2018: Critics' Choice Movie Award for Best Cinematography – First Man

In 2020, Sandgren was given the Lumière Award of the Royal Photographic Society.

References

External links
 
 

1972 births
Living people
Best Cinematographer Academy Award winners
Best Cinematographer Guldbagge Award winners
Best Cinematography BAFTA Award winners
Artists from Stockholm
Swedish cinematographers